Kevin Felipe Medel Soto (born 24 May 1996) is a Chilean footballer who plays as a central midfielder for C.D. Universidad de Concepción in the Primera B de Chile.

He is the brother of the Chilean international, Gary Medel.

External links
 

1996 births
Living people
Chilean footballers
San Marcos de Arica footballers
Everton de Viña del Mar footballers
Club Deportivo Universidad Católica footballers
Association football midfielders